Josephine Antoinette Estill (née Vadala; April 25, 1921 – December 9, 2010), known as Jo Estill, was an American singer, singing voice specialist and voice researcher. Estill is best known for her research and the development of Estill Voice Training, a programme for developing vocal skills based on deconstructing the process of vocal production into control of specific structures in the vocal mechanism.

Biography

Josephine Antoinette Vadala was born on April 25, 1921 in Donora, Pennsylvania, United States. She sang professionally on the radio in Pittsburgh from 1939–1940, and 1940–1947 in Hollywood. After marrying Thomas Estill of Colorado Springs, she toured Europe in 1953 with a lieder concert tour including programmes in The Hague, Amsterdam, Copenhagen, Oslo, London, Zurich, Geneva and Paris. Estill then had 13 years of performance as a soloist in Colorado Springs, Colorado, with the Air Force Academy Choral Concerts, Colorado Springs Symphony, Colorado Springs Opera as Dido Sr. Angelica, Aida, Tosca, among others.

In 1969, Estill received a BA in Liberal Arts from Colorado College, Colorado Springs, and in 1971, Estill received an MA in Music Education from Case Western Reserve University in Cleveland, Ohio. During her studies at Case Western Reserve University, Estill took 30 hours of speech and hearing elective classes, marking her introduction to voice science.

From 1972–1979, Estill was appointed Instructor in Voice in the Department of Otolaryngology, at the Upstate Medical Center, Syracuse, New York. It was here that Estill worked under Dr. Ray Colton, and Dr. David Brewer, two of the top voice researchers in the United States and began her pioneering research on her six voice qualities: speech, falsetto, sob, twang, opera, and belt. Colton, Brewer and Estill presented many papers on their research to the 'Care of the Professional Voice' conferences of the Voice Foundation.

Between 1980 and 1984, Jo enrolled in the City University of New York PhD graduate programme in Speech and Hearing. She completed all of her PhD course work and withdrew without submitting her dissertation. It was Dr. Osamu Fujimura at Ohio State University at Columbus, who assisted to gather necessary data for Jo to develop her research on her own.  

Estill's interests and voice research led to the development of Estill Voice Training and in 1991 Estill founded the company 'Estill Voice Training Systems' to protect the work and begin uniform certification of instructors.

On September 10, 2004, Estill was awarded an Honorary Doctorate, Doctor of Letters (LittD), from the University of East Anglia.

Estill died in Santa Rosa, California on December 9, 2010 of natural causes.

Research
Estill studied various qualities associated with different styles of singing, using techniques including EMG, electroglottography, voice signal analysis, X-rays of the phonating larynx, laryngeal fibre endoscopy, acoustic measurements and simultaneous videostroboscopy. This led to the development of a series of exercises to develop specific control over individual muscle groups and structures in the vocal mechanism. For example, Estill's endoscopic video recordings of the vocal tract during voicing demonstrated deconstruction techniques such as the 'silent laugh' that encourage the false vocal folds to retract. These exercises are now included within the Estill Voice Training system.

Influence and impact
Estill has presented courses and workshops on her research and the Estill Voice Training system all over the world. For example, Estill has presented in London by invitation of The Voice Research Society and the British Voice Association, and on courses organised by Gillyanne Kayes. Estill is reported to have made a big impact on the theatre scene in the UK because she offered an alternative approach to the traditional way of singing training.

Many authors and performers have acknowledged Estill and Estill Voice Training in the development of their own work including: Gillyanne Kayes, Deirdre Trundle, Mary McDonald Klimek, Donna Soto-Morettini, Joan Lader, Lise Olson, Dane Chalfin and Klea Blackhurst.

Marni Nixon recalls 'fighting with this wonderful teacher, Jo Estill' when she began to explore belting and pedagogy.

Discography
 On Wings Of Song (2009)

Selected published works

Notes

References
 
 
 
 
 
 
 
 
 
 
 
 
 
 
 
 
 
 
 
 
 

1921 births
2010 deaths
People from Donora, Pennsylvania
American vocal coaches